European Film Award – Jameson People's Choice Award – Best European Actor:

Winners and nominees
1997 – Javier Bardem
1998 – Antonio Banderas (The Mask of Zorro)
1999 – Sean Connery (Entrapment)
2000 – Ingvar E. Sigurdsson (Angels of the Universe)
2001 – Colin Firth (Bridget Jones's Diary)
2002 – Javier Camara (Hable Con Ella)
2003 – Daniel Brühl (Good Bye Lenin!)
2004 – Daniel Brühl (Love in Thoughts)
2005 – Orlando Bloom (Kingdom Of Heaven)

External links
European Film Academy archive

Actor
Awards disestablished in 2005
Awards established in 1997